
Gmina Jabłonowo Pomorskie is an urban-rural gmina (administrative district) in Brodnica County, Kuyavian-Pomeranian Voivodeship, in north-central Poland.

The gmina contains parts of the protected areas of Brodnica Landscape Park and Górzno-Lidzbark Landscape Park.

Villages
Apart from the town of Jabłonowo Pomorskie, Gmina Jabłonowo Pomorskie contains the villages and settlements of Adamowo, Budziszewo, Buk Góralski, Buk Pomorski, Bukowiec, Górale, Gorzechówko, Jabłonowo-Zamek, Kamień, Konojady, Lembarg, Mileszewy, Nowa Wieś, Piecewo, Płowęż and Szczepanki.

Neighbouring gminas
Gmina Jabłonowo Pomorskie is bordered by the gminas of Biskupiec, Bobrowo, Książki, Świecie nad Osą and Zbiczno.

References

Polish official population figures 2006

Jablonowo Pomorskie
Brodnica County